Virginia Lee O'Brien (April 18, 1919 – January 16, 2001) was an American actress, singer, and radio personality known for her comedic singing roles in Metro-Goldwyn-Mayer musicals of the 1940s.

Life and career
O'Brien primarily performed in comedic roles during the height of her formal film career. This was in part due to her intentionally humorous singing style, which involved her singing in a deadpan manner, with no facial expressions and very little movement– reportedly she stumbled upon this "gimmick" by accident during a stage show when she became virtually paralyzed with stage fright before singing a number in the Los Angeles stage production Meet the People. The audience found the performance to be hilarious and she was soon hired to repeat this performance in a number of movies beginning in 1940, for which she gained the nicknames "Frozen Face" and "Miss Ice Glacier" amongst others. When she was not singing, her acting style was just as emotive as other actresses, and she did not always employ her gimmick when singing, as evidenced by her performance in the excerpt from Show Boat in the 1946 film Till the Clouds Roll By. She made her Broadway debut in the short-lived musical Keep Off The Grass with Jimmy Durante and recorded four of the songs for Columbia Records. She also recorded several sides for Decca Records, including two of her signature songs – "The Wild, Wild West" and "Say We're Sweethearts Again."

Among the films she appeared in at MGM were The Big Store (1941) with the Marx Brothers, Lady Be Good (1941), Ship Ahoy (1942) with Eleanor Powell and Red Skelton, Thousands Cheer (in which she endured ribbing from Mickey Rooney about her singing style), Du Barry Was a Lady (with Skelton and Lucille Ball), the film version of Meet the People with Dick Powell, The Harvey Girls (with Judy Garland), and Ziegfeld Follies. After appearing once again with Red Skelton in 1947's Merton of the Movies and after a guest appearance the following year in the short, Musical Merry-Go-Round, O'Brien was suddenly dropped from her MGM film contract, and she moved into television and back to live performances.

She made two film appearances after this: Francis in the Navy (1955) and a brief appearance in the 1976 Walt Disney Studios comedy, Gus. She was among the stars in a 1972 nostalgia revue entitled The Big Show of 1928 with Allan Jones, Cass Daley, Beatrice Kay, and Sally Rand, which toured the country and played New York's Madison Square Garden. In 1984 she created a cabaret act, "Virginia O'Brien Salutes the Great MGM Musicals," which was recorded at the Masquer's Club in Hollywood, and is currently available on CD and on iTunes. She performed several times at such clubs as Hollywood's Roosevelt Hotel Cinegrill, the Vine St. Bar and Grill, and the Gardenia, as well as the Plush Room in San Francisco.

She continued to perform well into the 1990s with both her one-woman show and a production of Show Boat, co-starring Alan Young, and also headlined The Fabulous Palm Springs Follies.

She died aged 81 in Woodland Hills, California, from natural causes. She is buried at the Forest Lawn Memorial Park in Glendale, California.

O'Brien was a registered Republican and was supportive of Dwight Eisenhower's campaign during the 1952 presidential election. She also adhered to Catholicism.

Filmography

References

Sources

Further reading

External links

 Virginia O'Brien at BearManor Media VIRGINIA O'BRIEN: MGM'S DEADPAN DIVA (SOFTCOVER EDITION) by Robert Strom
 
 
 
 
 Virginia O'Brien – Salutes the Great MGM Musicals at ArtistDirect.com

1919 births
2001 deaths
American film actresses
American musical theatre actresses
Actresses from Los Angeles
Metro-Goldwyn-Mayer contract players
Burials at Forest Lawn Memorial Park (Glendale)
20th-century American singers
20th-century American actresses
20th-century American women singers
Catholics from California
California Republicans